Emma Johnson may refer to:

 Emma Elizabeth Johnson (1863–1927), American college president
 Emma Johnson (clarinettist) (born 1966), British clarinettist, winner of BBC Young Musician of the Year, 1984
 Emma Johnson (swimmer) (born 1980), Australian swimmer, won bronze at the 1996 Summer Olympics
 Emma Johnson (softball) (born 1993), American softball player
 Emma Johnson (writer) (born 1976), American journalist, blogger, and media personality